This is a list of actors who have played Jesus.

Notes
 Jesus (character) at IMDb

External links
Jesus in Film and TV: 13 Devilishly Handsome Actors Who've Played the Son of God
20 Actors That Have Played Jesus Christ
Actors who have portrayed Jesus
Actors Who Played Jesus
A look at actors who have played Jesus in movies
Blestemul unui rol fascinant: ce s-a intamplat cu actorii care l-au jucat pe Iisus in filme, ProTv

See also
The Nativity (1978) 
List of films set in ancient Rome#The Life of Jesus Christ
 The Robe (1953)
 List of films based on the Bible

 
List of actors
Jesus